The 2017 Rugby League World Cup Europe qualification is a rugby league tournament that was held in October 2011 to decide the European qualification for the 2013 Rugby League World Cup. It consisted of a round-robin play-off involving four teams; Russia, Italy, Serbia and Lebanon. Both Italy and Lebanon remained unbeaten, recording two wins and a draw each. However, Italy topped the group as a result of points difference and therefore qualified for the World Cup.

Standings

Italy vs Russia

Lebanon vs Serbia

Russia vs Lebanon

Serbia vs Italy

Serbia vs Russia

Italy vs Lebanon

Coached by Carlo Napolitano and captained by Anthony Minichiello, Italy's draw with Lebanon was enough for them to gain the 14th and final place in the 2013 World Cup.

Squads

Italy
The Italy squad as of 22 September 2011 is as follows:

Coach:  Carlo Napolitano

Lebanon
The Lebanon squad as at 22 September 2011 is as follows:

Coach:  David Bayssari

Russia
The Russia squad as at 22 September 2011 is as follows:

Coach:  Eduard Ososkov

Serbia
The Serbia squad was named on 22 September.

Coach:  Marko Janković

References 

2013 in rugby league